Phyllodesmium is a genus of predatory sea slugs, aeolid nudibranchs, marine gastropod molluscs in the family Facelinidae.

These nudibranchs occur in the tropical Indo-Pacific Ocean and warm temperate waters of Japan, Tasmania and South Africa.

The nudibranchs in this genus often show extraordinary mimicry, each species very closely resembling its prey species, which are octocorals, a kind of soft coral.

Some of the species are also unusual in that they are able to utilize zooxanthellae from their prey, in a symbiotic relationship that provides them with extra nutrition from photosynthesis, hence they are commonly called "solar-powered" sea slugs (also see the Sacoglossa).

Species 
Species within the genus Phyllodesmium include:

 Phyllodesmium acanthorhinum Moore & Gosliner, 2015
 Phyllodesmium briareum (Bergh, 1896)
 Phyllodesmium colemani Rudman, 1991
 Phyllodesmium crypticum Rudman, 1981
 Phyllodesmium guamense Avila, Ballesteros, Slattery, Starmer & Paul, 1998
 Phyllodesmium horridum (Macnae, 1954)
 Phyllodesmium hyalinum (Ehrenberg, 1831) - type species
 Phyllodesmium iriomotense Baba, 1991
 Phyllodesmium jakobsenae Burghardt & Wägele, 2004
 Phyllodesmium kabiranum Baba, 1991
 Phyllodesmium karenae Moore & Gosliner, 2009
 Phyllodesmium koehleri Burghardt, Schrödl & Wägele, 2008
 Phyllodesmium lembehense Burghardt, Schrödl & Wägele, 2008
 Phyllodesmium lizardense Burghardt, Schrödl & Wägele, 2008
 Phyllodesmium longicirrum (Bergh, 1905)
 Phyllodesmium macphersonae (Burn, 1962)
 Phyllodesmium magnum Rudman, 1991
 Phyllodesmium opalescens Rudman, 1991
 Phyllodesmium orientale Baba, 1991
 Phyllodesmium parangatum Ortiz & Gosliner, 2003
 Phyllodesmium pecten Rudman, 1981
 Phyllodesmium pinnatum Moore & Gosliner, 2009
 Phyllodesmium poindimiei (Risbec, 1928)
 Phyllodesmium rudmani Burghardt & Gosliner, 2006
 Phyllodesmium serratum (Baba, 1949)
 Phyllodesmium tuberculatum Moore & Gosliner, 2009
 Phyllodesmium undulatum Moore & Gosliner, 2014

Species brought into synonymy
 Phyllodesmium xeniae Gohar & Aboul-Ela, 1957: synonym of Phyllodesmium hyalinum Ehrenberg, 1831

Ecology 

Species of the genus Phyllodesmium are carnivorous and feed on octocorals (for example in the family Xeniidae). This is a unique feature within the Aeolidida.

Some of these nudibranchs contain endosymbiotic zooxanthellae, which are in effect single-celled plants. Zooxanthellae are one kind of dinoflagellate protists and they live only within other organisms, most notably in corals. The nudibranchs in this genus obtain zooxanthellae from their food, the soft corals.
As they previously did within the corals, the zooxanthellae provide the nudibranch with a supply of food in the form of the products of photosynthesis. The nudibranchs are able to avoid digesting these protists, and sequester them in their tissues instead. This process is somewhat reminiscent of the relationship between the Sacoglossan sea slugs and the living chloroplasts that they are able to sequester. Both these nudibranchs and the sacoglossans have been referred to as "solar-powered sea slugs".

Many other species of nudibranchs are brilliantly colored in order to warn away would-be predators, that is, they have aposematic coloring. This is because they contain in their tissues many examples of an organ called the cnidosac which contains undischarged cnidocytes (also known as nematocysts). These are stinging cells that the nudibranchs obtain from the tissues of the cnidarians they eat. Thus the very brightly colored nudibranchs are quite unpalatable for predators. Some nudibranchs, such as Glaucus atlanticus, are even capable of stinging humans very painfully.

The nudibranchs in this genus, however, use an opposite tactic. They do not have cnidosacs, and thus they would in reality be palatable to eat for various predators, however they are almost all extremely well camouflaged, so that they resemble almost perfectly the soft coral on which they live and feed, not only in color but also in form. The shape and form of the cerata of the nudibranch in each individual species resembles very closely the tentacles of the species of soft coral polyp on which that species feeds. This excellent camouflage also makes these nudibranchs difficult for humans to notice, and it is likely that a number of species in this genus have not yet been discovered, described and named scientifically.

Another tactic these nudibranchs use to protect themselves is that when threatened by a predator, they can drop one or more of their cerata. These organs will wiggle for some time after being cast off, hopefully distracting a predator away from the animal itself.<ref>[http://www.seaslugforum.net/factsheet.cfm?base=phylmagn Phyllodesmium magnum Rudman, 1991] . Sea Slug Forum, accessed 26 September 2009.</ref> This is an example of a defensive technique known as autotomy.

A molecular phylogeny study of Phyllodesmium by Moore and Gosliner (2011) demonstrated that the non-symbiotic species of Phyllodesmium evolved separately from the symbiotic species of Phyllodesmium. However, there is one exception: Phyllodesmium karenae'' evolved in the symbiotic clade and subsequently lost its zooxanthellae.

References

External links 
 

Facelinidae
Taxa named by Christian Gottfried Ehrenberg